The 1970 World Sportscar Championship season was the 18th season of FIA World Sportscar Championship motor racing. It featured the 1970 International Championship for Makes  and the 1970 International Cup for GT Cars, which were contested concurrently from 31 January to 11 October over a ten race series. The International Championship for Makes, which was open to Group 6 Sports-Prototypes, Group 5 Sports Cars and Group 4 Special GT Cars, was won by German manufacturer Porsche. The International Cup for GT Cars was also won by Porsche.

Schedule

† - The BOAC 1000 km was open to Group 6 Sports-Prototypes and Group 5 Sports Cars only. GT Cars did not participate.

Season results

Races

International Championship for Makes
Points were awarded for the first six places in each race on a 9-6-4-3-2-1 basis.  Manufacturers were only awarded points for their highest placed car  with no points awarded for positions filled by other cars from the same manufacturer.

No points were awarded for positions filled by cars other than Group 6 Sports-Prototypes, Group 5 Sports Cars and Group 4 Special GT Cars.

Out of the ten rounds in the championship, only the best seven results counted towards the points total for each manufacturer. Discarded points are shown within brackets in the following table.

International Cup for GT Cars
Points were awarded for the first six places in the GT category at each race on a 9-6-4-3-2-1 basis.  Manufacturers were only given points for their highest finishing car with no points awarded for positions filled by other cars from the same manufacturer.

Only the best seven results were retained towards the championship total of each manufacturer. Discarded points are shown within brackets in the following table.

The Grand Touring Car category did not participate in Round 3 at Brands Hatch.

The cars
The following models contributed towards the net point scores of their respective manufacturers.

International Championship for Makes

 Porsche 917K, 917L & 908/03
 Ferrari 512S
 Alfa Romeo T33/3
 Matra-Simca MS650
 Chevrolet Corvette

International Cup for GT Cars

 Porsche 911S, Porsche 911T & Porsche 914/6 GT
 Chevrolet Corvette & Chevrolet Camaro
 Lancia Fulvia HF
 Alpine A110 
 Lotus Europa
 MGB (BLMC)

References

External links
 Season: 1971 (International Championship for Makes), www.racingsportscars.com
 1970 - A year to rememeber - John Wyer's Gulf Porsche team

World Sportscar Championship seasons
World Sportscar Championship season